Campus Confessions is a 1938 American comedy film directed by George Archainbaud, featuring Betty Grable in her first starring role, and American basketball player Hank Luisetti in his only film appearance.

Plot 

Wayne Atterbury Sr. is president of Middleton College, where he tolerates no foolishness. So when his milquetoast son, Wayne Jr., enrolls as a freshman, the boy makes it clear to newspaper reporter Joyce Gilmore and to every student he meets that school must be all work and no play. This makes him instantly unpopular.

Hank Luisetti plays basketball for the school, which has never had a winning team. He is tempted to switch to a different college when Wayne Jr. offers his father's estate as a training camp. Luisetti is surprised when Wayne turns out to have a knack for the game himself. He becomes a basketball star and Joyce becomes a lot more interested in him.

A big game against arch-rival State U is coming up, and Middleton finally has a shot at winning. Hank, however, flunks math, so Dean Wilton needs to suspend him from the team. The stuffed-shirt Atterbury watches his son play basketball and gets so excited about winning, he approves a new math test for Hank while the game's in progress. Hank passes, then scores 24 points in the final period to help carry Middleton to victory, whereupon both Atterburys are carried off by the happy crowd.

Cast 

 Betty Grable as Joyce Gilmore
 Eleanore Whitney as Susie Quinn
 William Henry as Wayne Atterbury Jr.
 Fritz Feld as 'Lady MacBeth'
 John Arledge as Freddy Fry
 Thurston Hall as Wayne Atterbury Sr.
 Roy Gordon as Dean Wilton
 Lane Chandler as Coach Parker
 Richard Denning as Buck Hogan
 Matty Kemp as Ed Riggs
 Sumner Getchell as 'Blimp' Garrett
 Hank Luisetti as himself

External links 
 
 

1938 films
1938 comedy films
1930s American films
1930s English-language films
American basketball films
American black-and-white films
American comedy films
Films directed by George Archainbaud
Films set in universities and colleges
Paramount Pictures films